was the seventh of twenty-four , built for the Imperial Japanese Navy following World War I. When introduced into service, these ships were the most powerful destroyers in the world. They served as first-line destroyers through the 1930s, and remained formidable weapons systems well into the Pacific War.

History
Construction of the advanced Fubuki-class destroyers was authorized as part of the Imperial Japanese Navy's expansion program from fiscal 1923, intended to give Japan a qualitative edge with the world's most modern ships. The Fubuki class had performance that was far advanced over previous destroyer designs, so much so that they were designated . The large size, powerful engines, high speed, large radius of action and unprecedented armament gave these destroyers the firepower similar to many light cruisers in other navies. Usugumo, built at the Ishikawajima Shipyards in Tokyo was laid down on 21 October 1926, launched on 26 December 1927 and commissioned on 26 July 1928. Originally assigned hull designation “Destroyer No. 41”, she was completed as Usugumo.

Operational history
On completion, Usugumo was assigned to Destroyer Division 12 under the IJN 2nd Fleet. During the Second Sino-Japanese War, Usugumo was assigned to cover landings of Japanese forces in southern China. On 15 August 1940, she was severely damaged by a naval mine, and was taken back to Maizuru Naval Arsenal.

World War II history
At the time of the attack on Pearl Harbor, Usugumo was still under repairs, and was not available for combat duty until the end of July 1942, when she was assigned to the IJN 5th Fleet, and sent to the Ōminato Guard District. From August to the middle of October, Usugumo was assigned to patrols off the coast of Hokkaidō and the Chishima islands and to escort duty between Paramushiro and Attu and Kiska in the Aleutian Islands to the end of January 1943. In February 1943, she returned to Kure Naval Arsenal for repairs.

During the Battle of the Komandorski Islands on 26 March 1943, Usugumo was escorting the transport Sanko Maru, and thus did not see any combat during that engagement. Usugumo resumed transport runs between Paramushiro and Attu in April, and in July and August assisted in the evacuation of surviving Japanese forces from Kiska. At the end of November, Usugumo returned to Kure for refit.

After spending January 1944 in training in the Inland Sea, Usugumo returned to Ōminato at the start of February to resume northern patrols and escort duty. At the end of March, she escorted a troopship convoy to Uruppu Island

Two torpedoes broke her back; she sank in six minutes, leaving 49 survivors from a crew of 316.

On 10 September 1944, Usugumo was struck from the navy list.

Notes

References

External links

Fubuki-class destroyers
Ships built by IHI Corporation
1927 ships
Second Sino-Japanese War naval ships of Japan
World War II destroyers of Japan
Ships sunk by American submarines
Shipwrecks in the Sea of Okhotsk
World War II shipwrecks in the Pacific Ocean
Maritime incidents in July 1944
Ships of the Aleutian Islands campaign